Miluše Hadryková (born ) is a retired Czech female volleyball player. She was part of the Czech Republic women's national volleyball team.

She participated in the 1994 FIVB Volleyball Women's World Championship. On club level, she played with Olymp Praga.

Clubs
 Olymp Praga (1994)

References

1968 births
Living people
Czech women's volleyball players
Place of birth missing (living people)